The Des Moines Rock Island Depot is a combination passenger and freight pair of buildings in the Beaux-Arts style in downtown Des Moines, Iowa. Construction of the Chicago, Rock Island and Pacific Railroad (Rock Island) passenger building was completed in 1901. The building is in the Civic Center Historic District, west of the Des Moines River.  A covered freight platform and brick building added in 1910 on the east side of the pair of buildings. 

An unusual aspect is that it spanned from one building at 107 Fourth Street to another building at 108 Fourth Street, spanning over Fourth Street with a metal arch. The principal building, the passenger station, on the west side of Fourth Street, is a two story brick structure.

Passenger trains
The station served Rock Island trains from the north to the south, and from the west to the east.
In 1957 passenger trains included: 
multiple Rocket trains (Chicago – Davenport - Des Moines)
Rocky Mountain Rocket (Chicago – Davenport - Colorado Springs, CO)
Kansas City Rocket (Minneapolis-St. Paul – Kansas City)
Twin Star Rocket (Minneapolis-St. Paul – Houston)

Decline and modern use
By 1970, passenger service was a mere single train west (#7) to Council Bluffs and east (#10) to Chicago. Service ended on May 31, 1970; with the end of the Council Bluffs train. 

In 1986 the Douglas Wells architectural firm designed the restoration of the building. The western part was used for the Business Record offices, and the freight part, the eastern section, was restored for restaurant use.

The building remains intact today. However, the station-associated tracks, which in the past had been numerous, have been reduced to a single track further from the station.

The nearest passenger train service is in Osceola, 40 miles to the south, where Amtrak's California Zephyr makes a daily westbound and eastbound stop.

References

Railway stations in the United States opened in 1901
Des Moines
Former railway stations in Iowa
Railway stations closed in 1970
Transportation buildings and structures in Polk County, Iowa